Divci is a village in the municipality of Valjevo, Serbia. According to the 2002 population census, the village has a population of 717 people.

See also 
 Divci Airport

References

Populated places in Kolubara District